Drain Me may refer to:
"Drain Me", a song by Sentenced from The Funeral Album
"Drain Me", a song by Slaves on Dope from Metafour
"Drain Me", a song recorded by Model Child and written by Danny Parker